Abdala Faye (born January 1, 1971) is a Senegalese mixed media artist, and member of the Serer noble Faye family. He is the grandson of former Senegalese king, Mbaye Ndiay Djaly.

Early life

At the age of 12 he had his first showing in Paris, France and sold all of his paintings. From that day on, Abdala immersed himself in art and became a full-time artist. He knew that art, not government service, was his life's calling.

Faye began traveling the continent of Africa and Europe at the age of 15.

In Burkina Faso, Abdala learned the methods of batik (printing on cloth with wax), and mudclothe (printing on cloth with a mixture of mud and herbs).

Career

Abdala's art has been featured in exhibits around the world including Senegal, Brasil, France, Belgium, Germany and the United States.

Faye opened Akebuland in Iowa City, IA USA.  The store sold paintings and other authentic African goods crafted by villagers in Ndem, Senegal. Among the items were Abdala's batik and mudclothe designs and finger paintings.

In 2008 he moved to Cincinnati, OH where he opened The Faye Gallery.

In addition to his artwork, Faye spends his time playing the hand drum and the bass guitar.  He is also fluent in many languages, including Wolof, Serer, Jola, French, English, Bambara, and Arabic.

Giving Back

Abdala likes to give back to the community.  He is the co-founder of "Art Express". Art Express aids those with disabilities by means of art experimentation regardless of their economical status.  He also donates pieces and shares positive messages to art students in his community.

Quotes

Exhibits

 2007 Gallery Guichard
 2002 - 2005 Chait Gallery
 2001 CFM Gallery
 2001 Marcum's Gallery

Notes

References

 "Senegalese Quilts on Display," Iowa City Press-Citizen, March 11, 2004: 6.
 "Abdala Faye," Deanna Truman-Cook, Iowa City Press-Citizen, February 25, 2004: 10C.
 "Learning to Play Through the Pain of Drumming," Julie K. Throm, The Daily Iowan, February 10, 2004: 7A.
 "Crowning Achievement," Amy Jennings, The Gazette, January 26, 2004: 1-2D.
 "Service With Class," Amir Efrati, The Gazette, January 28, 2004: 2D.
 "African Continues Resistance With Shop," D. Wole Murray-Ife, Iowa City Press Citizen, October 31, 2003: 6B.
 "In the Uptown Arts Gallery," Elisabeth Beasley, Uptown Bill's Newsletter, December 2002: 3.
 "Prince Abdel: Une Timidite vaincue" Dakar Madin, May 29–31, 1998: 1.

External links

 

1971 births
Living people
Senegalese sculptors
Serer artists
Serer royalty
Abdala